This list of Museums in Málaga contains museums in both the city of Málaga, Spain and the province of Málaga, Spain.

List

See also
 List of museums in Andalusia
 List of museums in Madrid
 List of museums in Barcelona

References

Málaga
Malaga
Museums in Málaga